Tetrorchidium brevifolium is a species of plant in the family Euphorbiaceae. It is found in Guatemala and Honduras.

References

Adenoclineae
Endangered plants
Taxonomy articles created by Polbot